is a Japanese animator and director who directed The Big O and the King of Thorn film.

Filmography
 Space Adventure Cobra: The Movie (1982) (animation)
 Nausicaä of the Valley of the Wind (1984) (assistant director and production assistant to Hayao Miyazaki)
 Persia, the Magic Fairy (1984) (director)
 Maris the Chojo (1986) (director)
 Magical Idol Pastel Yumi (1986) (episode director)
 Appleseed (1988) (director)
 Doomed Megalopolis (1991) (director)
 Giant Robo (1992) (animation director)
 Those Who Hunt Elves (1996) (director of series 1)
 Sentimental Journey (1998) (director)
 The Big O (1999) (series director)
 Brave King GaoGaiGar Final (2000) (storyboard)
 Argento Soma  (2000) (director)
 Samurai Champloo  (2004) (storyboard)
 Karas (2005) (storyboard)
 Keroro Gunsō the Super Movie (2006) (key animation)
 Freedom (2006) (storyboard and episode director on episode 1)
 Appleseed: Ex Machina (2007) (storyboard)
 King of Thorn (2009) (director)
 Tiger & Bunny  (2011) (storyboard)
 Hello from the Countries of the World (2015) (director)

External links
 

Anime directors
Sunrise (company) people
Topcraft
Living people
Year of birth missing (living people)